Elias Sebastian Solberg (born 3 March 2004) is a Norwegian footballer currently playing as a midfielder for Lillestrøm.

Club career
Having progressed through the youth ranks of Ull/Kisa, Solberg established himself in the first team for the 2020 season, scoring three goals from sixteen appearances. These performances caught the eye of Italian side Juventus, and in July 2021 he signed for The Old Lady. In October 2021, he was named by English newspaper The Guardian as one of the best players born in 2004 worldwide.

In August 2022, having failed to break into the youth sides of Juventus, Solberg returned to Norway to sign for Lillestrøm.

International career
Solberg has represented Norway at under-15 and under-18 level.

Career statistics

Club

Notes

References

2004 births
Living people
Norwegian footballers
Norway youth international footballers
Association football midfielders
Norwegian Third Division players
Norwegian First Division players
Eliteserien players
Ullensaker/Kisa IL players
Juventus F.C. players
Lillestrøm SK players
Norwegian expatriate footballers
Norwegian expatriate sportspeople in Italy
Expatriate footballers in Italy